Marcelo Ríos was the defending champion but did not compete that year.

Carlos Moyá won in the final 6–4, 3–6, 7–6(7–2) against Jérôme Golmard.

Seeds
A champion seed is indicated in bold text while text in italics indicates the round in which that seed was eliminated.

  Carlos Moyá (champion)
  Albert Portas (second round)
  Bohdan Ulihrach (second round)
  Michal Tabara (second round)
  Jérôme Golmard (final)
  Ivan Ljubičić (quarterfinals)
  Félix Mantilla (quarterfinals)
  Agustín Calleri (second round)

Draw

References
 2001 Croatia Open Draw

Singles
Singles
Croatia Open Singles